Bruno Sebastian Martelotto (born 11 March 1982 in San Francisco, Córdoba) is a professional Argentine soccer player currently playing for Antartida Argentina in the Argentina Regional League.

Martelotto formerly played for MPPJ FC in Malaysian Super League in Malaysia, for Ñublense in Primera División in Chile and for AO Kavala and Panetolikos F.C. in Beta Ethniki in Greece.

He returned to Malaysia and joined the Malaysia Premier League club, ATM FA alongside Marlon Alex James.

Honours

MPPJ Selangor
 Malaysia Cup: 2003
 Malaysia Premier League: 2004
 Malaysian Charity Shield: 2004

ATM FA
 Malaysia Premier League: 2012
 Malaysian Charity Shield: 2013

References

External links
 
 Bruno Martelotto at ESPN Deportes 
 

1982 births
Living people
Sportspeople from Córdoba Province, Argentina
Argentine people of Italian descent
Argentine footballers
Panetolikos F.C. players
Super League Greece players
San Martín de San Juan footballers
Ñublense footballers
Penang F.C. players
ATM FA players
Negeri Sembilan FA players
C.D. Antofagasta footballers
Santiago Morning footballers
Expatriate footballers in Chile
Argentine expatriate footballers
Argentine expatriate sportspeople in Greece
Expatriate footballers in Malaysia
Argentine expatriate sportspeople in Malaysia
Malaysia Super League players
Association football midfielders